Judy Lynn Kelly (née Voiten; April 16, 1936 – May 26, 2010) was an American country music singer and beauty queen who was crowned Miss Idaho in 1955.

Life and career
Lynn was born in Boise, Idaho, United States. As a teenager she joined a nationwide tour of Grand Ole Opry performers. She was hired to fill in for Jean Shepard, who had become ill during the tour. She soon married her manager and for over 20 years her show was a popular staple piece of the Las Vegas strip, featuring her brand of country music, appearing in dazzling Nudie costumes.

In 1951, Lynn starred in the Broadway musical Top Banana and its film adaptation, alongside comedic actor Phil Silvers who won a Tony Award for his performance.

Death
Lynn retired from the music business in 1980 to become a Christian minister. She died on May 26, 2010, after suffering congestive heart failure at her home in Jeffersonville, Indiana.

Discography

Albums

Singles

A "Married to a Memory" also peaked at number 4 on the Bubbling Under Hot 100 Singles chart and number 42 on the Canadian RPM Country Tracks chart. It also charted at #18 on the Billboard AC charts.

References

1936 births
2010 deaths
American women country singers
American country singer-songwriters
Miss America 1950s delegates
Musicians from Boise, Idaho
People from Jeffersonville, Indiana
Country musicians from Indiana
20th-century American people
21st-century American women
Singer-songwriters from Indiana
Singer-songwriters from Idaho